Lehlohonolo Moses Maliehe (born 3 February 1966) is a South African former professional soccer player who was most recently manager of Lesotho.

Playing career
Maliehe was born in Klerksdorp, South Africa to Basotho parents from Teyateyaneng, Lesotho. Maliehe played youth football in South Africa for Klerksdorp City and ICL Birds, the latter being alongside Lucas Radebe. In 1987, Maliehe moved to Lesotho, signing for Lioli and then Matlama, before returning to South Africa to sign for Vaal Reef Stars. Maliehe re-signed for Lioli upon his return to Lesotho, staying with the club until retirement.

Managerial career
After a period of coaching numerous clubs in Lesotho, Maliehe was appointed Lesotho U20 manager in 2008.

In July 2015, Maliehe was named manager of former club Matlama.

On 24 November 2016, Maliehe was appointed manager of Lesotho after being interim manager of the country since November 2015. In 2019, Maliehe was replaced by Thabo Senong as Lesotho manager due to ill health.

Honours
Lioli

Lesotho Cup: 2007

References

Living people
People from Klerksdorp
Association football defenders
South African soccer players
South African soccer managers
Lesotho national football team managers
1966 births